William Sánchez Tejeda (born February 19, 1986) is a male volleyball and beach volleyball player from the Dominican Republic. He participated in the NORCECA Beach Volleyball Circuit 2009 with Yhonastan Fabian, earning the 11th position.

In the Dominican Republic Volleyball League, he won the 3rd place with Sánchez Ramírez at the 2008 league championship.

Clubs
  Sánchez Ramírez (2008)
  Espaillat (2008)

References

External links
 
 FIVB Profile
 

1986 births
Living people
Dominican Republic men's volleyball players
Dominican Republic beach volleyball players
Men's beach volleyball players
Beach volleyball players at the 2019 Pan American Games
Pan American Games competitors for the Dominican Republic